Beta adrenergic agonists or beta agonists are medications that relax muscles of the airways, causing widening of the airways and resulting in easier breathing. They are a class of sympathomimetic agents, each acting upon the beta adrenoceptors. In general, pure beta-adrenergic agonists have the opposite function of beta blockers: beta-adrenoreceptor agonist ligands mimic the actions of both epinephrine- and norepinephrine- signaling, in the heart and lungs, and in smooth muscle tissue; epinephrine expresses the higher affinity. The activation of β1, β2 and β3 activates the enzyme, adenylate cyclase. This, in turn, leads to the activation of the secondary messenger cyclic adenosine monophosphate (cAMP); cAMP then activates protein kinase A (PKA) which phosphorylates target proteins, ultimately inducing smooth muscle relaxation and contraction of the cardiac tissue.

Function

Activation of β1 receptors induces positive inotropic, chronotropic output of the cardiac muscle, leading to increased heart rate and blood pressure, secretion of ghrelin from the stomach, and renin release from the kidneys.

Activation of β2 receptors induces smooth muscle relaxation in the lungs, gastrointestinal tract, uterus, and various blood vessels. Increased heart rate and heart muscle contraction are associated with the β1 receptors; however, β2 cause vasodilation in the myocardium.

β3 receptors are mainly located in adipose tissue. Activation of the β3 receptors induces the metabolism of lipids.

Medical uses
Indications of administration for β agonists include:
 Bradycardia (slow heart rate)
 Asthma
 Chronic obstructive pulmonary disease (COPD)
 Heart failure
 Allergic reactions
 Hyperkalemia
 Beta blocker poisoning
 Premature labor (this is an off-label use and could be detrimental)

Side effects
Although minor compared to those of epinephrine, beta agonists usually have mild to moderate adverse effects, which include anxiety, hypertension, increased heart rate, and insomnia. Other side effects include headaches and essential tremor. Hypoglycemia was also reported due to increased secretion of insulin in the body from activation of β2 receptors.

In 2013, zilpaterol, a β agonist sold by Merck, was temporarily withdrawn due to signs of sickness in some cattle that were fed the drug.

Receptor selectivity
Most agonists of the beta receptors are selective for one or more beta-adrenoreceptors. For example, patients with low heart rate are given beta agonist treatments that are more "cardio-selective" such as dobutamine, which increases the force of contraction of the heart muscle. Patients who are suffering from chronic inflammatory lung diseases such as asthma or COPD may be treated with medication targeted to induce more smooth muscle relaxation in the lungs and less contraction of the heart, including first-generation drugs like salbutamol (albuterol) and later-generation medications in the same class.

β3 agonists are currently under clinical research and are thought to increase the breakdown of lipids in obese patients.

β1 agonists

β1 agonists stimulate adenylyl cyclase activity and opening of calcium channel (cardiac stimulants; used to treat cardiogenic shock, acute heart failure, bradyarrhythmias). Selected examples are:
 Denopamine
 Dobutamine
 Dopexamine (β1 and β2)
 Epinephrine (non-selective)
 Isoprenaline (INN), isoproterenol (USAN) (β1 and β2)
 Prenalterol
 Xamoterol

β2 agonists

β2 agonists  stimulate adenylyl cyclase activity and closing of calcium channel (smooth muscle relaxants; used to treat asthma and COPD). Selected examples are:

 Arformoterol
 Buphenine
 Clenbuterol
 Dopexamine (β1 and β2)
 Epinephrine (non-selective)
 Fenoterol
 Formoterol
 Isoetarine
 Isoprenaline (INN), isoproterenol (USAN) (β1 and β2)
 Levosalbutamol (INN), levalbuterol (USAN)
 Orciprenaline (INN), metaproterenol (USAN)
 Pirbuterol
 Procaterol
 Ritodrine
 Salbutamol (INN), albuterol (USAN)
 Salmeterol
 Terbutaline

Undetermined/unsorted
These agents are also listed as agonists by MeSH.

 Arbutamine
 Befunolol
 Bromoacetylalprenololmenthane
 Broxaterol
 Cimaterol
 Cirazoline
 Etilefrine
 Hexoprenaline
 Higenamine
 Isoxsuprine
 Mabuterol
 Methoxyphenamine
 Oxyfedrine
 Ractopamine
 Reproterol
 Rimiterol
 Tretoquinol
 Tulobuterol
 Zilpaterol
 Zinterol

See also
 Alpha-adrenergic agonist

References

External links